Gil Jamieson (31 January 1934 – 14 June 1992) was an Australian painter. Jamieson was born in the central Queensland town of Monto in 1934 and died there in 1992.

Career
Jamieson liked to be thought of as a Romantic.  He objected to the labels of art commentators. He painted figurative art works, landscape art works, and portraits striking for their passionate intensity of both subject and colour.  He wrestled with the tough reality of survival in the bush and lived the landscape that he painted.

He lived and worked on the land with his family raising cattle on a bush block near Monto.  He embarked on extensive expeditions throughout Australia capturing the subtle beauty and magnificence of the country in gouaches he called his 'sonnets'.  His 72-foot 360 degree mural Jay Creek (depicting Jay Creek, Northern Territory), an oil on canvas, painted on location in Central Australia, his largest and a most engrossing work was painted in four days in searing heat. 
 
Jamieson regarded himself as a self-taught artist, however he attended Brisbane Central Technical College (with Melville Haysom), 1956–57.  While in Brisbane he aspired to political cartooning, worked as a quick sketch artist outside a nightclub and held his first exhibition at a Brisbane pub

Jamieson and his wife Maureen moved from Monto to Melbourne and his career flourished.  His work was taken up by John Reed of Heide Museum of Modern Art where he exhibited. He developed strong friendships with fellow artists: George Johnson, Fred Williams, John Perceval, Edwin Tanner to name a few.  These friendships sustained and affirmed his contribution to Australian art as later in his career, fellow artists such as Cliff Pugh and Arthur Boyd supported his work. He chose to return to the bush and relative obscurity returning regularly to exhibit in Melbourne.

Throughout his career Jamieson had many supporters of his work including Kym Bonython and Rudy Komon. He had a long association with Rockhampton exhibiting there and in Brisbane regularly throughout his career.  Rockhampton Art Gallery toured a retrospective for two years throughout regional Australia and overseas 1997–9.

Exhibitions
Museum of Modern Art, Melbourne 1960
Rudy Komon Gallery, Sydney 1961
South Yarra Gallery, Melbourne 1962
Bonython Gallery, Adelaide 1963
South Yarra Gallery, Melbourne 1964
Australian Galleries, Melbourne 1966
Rudy Komon Gallery, Sydney 1967
Bonython Gallery, Sydney 1971
Bonython Gallery, Adelaide 1971
John Gild Gallery, Perth 1972
Talamo Gallery, Melbourne 1972
Talamo Gallery, Melbourne 1973 (Jay Creek exhibition, 72 ft landscape from Central Australia)
Reid Gallery, Brisbane 1974
Gallery Up Top, Rockhampton 1974
Gallery Up Top, Rockhampton 1975
Gallery Up Top, Rockhampton 1976
Gallery Up Top, Rockhampton 1977
Gallery Up Top, Rockhampton 1978
Philip Bacon Gallery, Brisbane 1978
CIEA Rockhamption 1978 ('Jay Creek' exhibit, opening library by HRH Princess Alexandra)
Adelaide Festival Centre 1978 ('Jay Creek' complementary exhibit in theatre foyer)
Bakehouse Gallery, Mackay 1978
Gallery Up Top, Rockhampton 1979
Gallery Up Top, Rockhampton 1980
Realities Gallery, Melbourne 1981
City Hall, Brisbane 1982
Gallery Up Top, Rockhampton 1982
Nerang Gallery, Gold Coast 1983
Rudy Komon Gallery, Sydney 1983
Realities Gallery, Melbourne 1983
Northern Territory Museum of Arts and Sciences, Darwin 1984
The Schubert Gallery, Broadbeach 1985
William Mora Gallery, Melbourne 1988.

Collections
His work was represented in many major public collections, including:
National Gallery of Australia
National Gallery of Victoria
Queensland Art Gallery
La Trobe University Art Museum
Parliament House, Canberra
Parliament House, Queensland
Monto Library, Queensland

Awards
1965: McCaughey Prize, NGV Melbourne
1977: Maryborough Watercolour Prize
1978: Bundaberg Painting Prize
1978: Bundaberg Watercolour Prize
1978: Rockhampton Art Prize

References

External links
  Australian Dictionary of Biography (2016) "Jamieson, Hugh Gilmour (Gil) (1934–1992)"Accessed 8November 2019
 Brown, Phil (2005) "Memoir: Our Man up There" Griffith REVIEW Edition 9 – Up North: Myths, Threats & Enchantment Accessed 6 May 2010
 MacLaughlan, Susan (2019) Gil Jamieson Film made for 25 October Gil Jamieson Resurrection Exhibition at the Rex in Monto Queensland Accessed 27 October 2019

1934 births
1992 deaths
People from Queensland
20th-century Australian painters